Diary of a Nudist, also known as  Diary of a Girl Reporter, Diary of a Naturist, Girl Reporter Diary, Nature Camp Confidential, Nature Camp Diary or Nudist Confidential, is an American 1961 nudist film produced and directed by Doris Wishman.

Plot

Arthur Sherwood (Casserly), editor-in-chief of The Evening Times, stumbles upon a nudist camp and smells a good story. He assigns girl reporter Stacy Taylor (Decker) to join the camp so she can write an exposé on the nudists' indecent lifestyle. Stacy becomes convinced of the sincerity of the nudist philosophy, however, and refuses to write a negative report. Sherwood joins the camp to complete the project, only to decide for himself that nudism is happy and wholesome.

Cast 
Davee Decker as Stacy Taylor
Norman Casserly as Arthur Sherwood
Dolores Carlos as Marie
Allan Blacker
Joan Bamford as Helen
Maria Stinger as Eleanor
Harry W. Stinger as John
Brigitte Bernard
Allison Louise Downe
Ronald M. Ziegler
June Marko as Annette
Gustave A. Hoek
Nellie Hoek
Phyllis Hoek as Phyllis
Sandra Hoek
Charles Allen as Tom
Warrene Gray as Fran
Una Diehl as Susan
Gloria Flowers
Zelda R. Suplee as Nudist Camp Director
Doris Wishman as Marie/Lady waving from Porch (uncredited)

See also
 List of American films of 1961
Nudity in film

References

External links 

1960s romance films
1961 films
1960s English-language films
American sexploitation films
Films directed by Doris Wishman
Utopian films
1960s American films